Vondrák may refer to:

 Václav Vondrák (1859–1925), Czech slavist
 Jaroslav Vondrák (1881-1937), Czech architect
 Zdeněk Vondrák (*1927), Czech general
 Jan Vondrák (*1940), Czech astronomer
 Ivo Vondrák (*1959), Czech professor and politician
 35356 Vondrák, a main belt asteroid named after Jan Vondrák